Fibuloides wuyiensis is a moth of the family Tortricidae. It is known from Fujian in China.

References

Enarmoniini